The Paro Chhu is a river of western Bhutan. It is a tributary of the Wong Chhu, which is known as the Raidak in its lower reaches.

Course
The Paro Chhu rises to the south of Chomo Lhari (mountain of the Goddess). Its glacial waters plunge torrentially through alpine meadows and deep gorges in the Jigme Dorji National Park, and descends into a wide, open, undulating valley. Sub-alpine and temperate forests are found along its middle and lower reaches. A prime trout stream, it nourishes lush green rice fields and apple and peach orchards on its banks.

Paro
The Paro Chhu flows through the Paro Valley, which is the site of one of Bhutan's main towns, Paro, and many important monasteries. The two best known of the monasteries are Taktshang ("Tiger's nest" in Dzongkha), and Paro Dzong. Taktshang clings to a ledge of a high cliff approximately 15 km north of Paro.  Taktshang and Paro Dzong are two of the finest examples of Bhutanese architecture. Below the dzong, a traditional wooden covered bridge called Nyamai Zam spans the Paro Chhu. The original bridge was washed away in a flood in 1969 and the present one is a reconstruction. Earlier versions of this bridge were removed to protect the dzong. The bridge was also shown in the movie Little Buddha by Bernardo Bertolucci  Below the town of Paro, the river runs immediately to the west of Bhutan's only international airport.   That airport is renowned for the hair-raising final approach.

Kayaking
This stretch has many small, boulder rapids and wave trains. There is one class IV–V boulder choke, about 3 km from the put in, which can be run on the left and scouted from the right. It is suitable for kayaks only as the river is too small for a raft to be enjoyable. After this, the river enters a short, scenic canyon with more class II–III rapids. The stretch ends at Chhuzom. More experienced kayakers can continue down the Wong Chhu.

Chhuzom
Chhuzom (Chhu means river and zom means join) is the place where Paro Chhu and Wong Chhu meet. For many traditional Bhutanese this confluence is considered the union of a father and mother river. Paro Chhu represents the father and is sometimes called the Pho Chhu, Wong Chu represents the mother. Because Bhutanese traditions regards such a convergence of rivers as inauspicious, there are three chortens here to ward off evil spells in the area. Each chorten is in a different style—Bhutanese, Tibetan and Nepali. The upper reaches of Wong Chhu, above Chhuzom, are sometimes referred to as Thimphu Chhu.

Notes

Bibliography

Rivers of Bhutan